The first series of Race Across the World first aired on BBC Two from 3 March to 7 April 2019. Five pairs of racers travelled from London to Singapore, with the contestants each given £1,329 for the whole race without using air transport. The racers travelled over a distance of 12,000 miles in 50 days.

The first series featured five pairs of competitors at the start of the race: Natalie and Shameema, Jinda and Bindu, Darron and Alex, Josh and Felix, and Sue and Clare. Jinda and Bindu withdrew due to family illness in the first episode, and were replaced by Elaine and Tony. Sue and Clare were eliminated when they finished last in Baku. Retired PE teachers Tony and Elaine Teasdale were the first to reach the final checkpoint in Singapore, and were crowned the winners.

The series was the most successful debut for a factual entertainment show on BBC Two in over three years, and one of the most-watched shows of the year for the channel.

Contestants

Results summary 

Colour key:
 – Team withdrawn
 – Team eliminated
 – Series winners

Route

The checkpoints in the first series are:

Race summary

Leg 1: London → Delphi

The race started from Old Royal Naval College in London, finishing the first leg at the Amalia Hotel in Delphi, Greece.

Josh and Felix made it to Calais on the first day and went down to Munich on the second. They worked in a farm outside Munich and gained a significant increase in cash. They quickly spent this on a train to Budapest and a coach to Athens, swapping buses to reach Delphi on the sixth day.

Darron and Alex went on an overnight coach to Düsseldorf on Day One followed by another coach to Budapest, before catching a train to Belgrade. They were forced to splash out on a taxi to avoid being delayed in the Balkans, arriving 4 hours behind the leaders.

After a slow start, Natalie & Shameema took the ferry to Calais on Day Two before working in Lyon. They then went via Milan and over to the ferry port of Brindisi. They were the third team to reach Delphi. 

Sue and Claire went via Lille and Paris to reach Milan, then travelled to Venice to catch a ferry to Greece. They arrived in Delphi 24 hours behind Josh and Felix.

Jinda and Bindu caught the ferry to Calais on Day One and made it to Aachen on the evening of Day 2, but returned home after receiving news of a family illness. Tony and Elaine took their place and went through France, Germany and into Italy and caught a ferry to Greece. They reached Delphi just a few minutes after Sue and Claire.

Leg 2: Delphi → Baku

The teams were informed that whoever arrived in Baku last would be eliminated. The two leading teams Josh & Felix and Darron & Alex took a boat to Çeşme, and then to Ankara where they took a slow Eastern Express train to Kars, which allowed the other teams to catch up. Fearing they were at risk of finishing fifth, Josh & Felix took an expensive taxi ride from Tbilisi to Baku.

All the other teams chose the land route via Istanbul, where Natalie & Shameema worked to earn some money. As they came last in the previous leg, Elaine & Tony chose to travel non-stop by train and bus to Tbilisi, and managed to reach Baku in first place on Day 13. In contrast, Sue & Clare decided to take a break in Tbilisi after a long bus journey, which resulted in their elimination.

Leg 3: Baku → Tashkent

All four teams ended up on the same ferry from the Port of Baku in Älät to Kuryk. However, due to a storm on the Caspian Sea, they had to stay on the ship for five days.

On reaching Kazakhstan, three teams travelled through Uzbekistan from its western border with Kazakhstan to Tashkent. Only Josh & Felix chose the more northerly route through Kazakhstan. They stopped in Shymkent and travelled to watch a game of kokpar.  Although their journey was longer, they arrived at the checkpoint at Tashkent only a couple of minutes behind Elaine & Tony.

Elaine & Tony travelled by taxis exclusively over a thousand miles from Kazakhstan until Samarkand, partly financing their spending spree by working as farm hands at a nomadic camp in the Kyzylkum Desert. Although both Darron & Alex and Elaine & Tony reached Samarkand around the same time, Darron & Alex managed to get an earlier train to Tashkent and so finished first at the checkpoint at Hotel Uzbekistan.

Natalie & Shameema took advantage of a free car ride from Kuryk; however, their departure was delayed for 36 hours while their driver made arrangements for his trip. He then paused in Khiva while waiting for word from a friend, so the pair decided to continue by train, but still finished in last place.

Leg 4: Tashkent → Huangyao

All teams travelled to Almaty in Kazakhstan to cross into China, via the Khorgas Border Crossing.  Natalie & Shameema stopped in Almaty to visit  the Shymbulak ski resort. All teams had to pass through Xinjiang—one of the autonomous regions of China and a politically sensitive region, which did not permit filming.

Darron & Alex went to Chengdu, where they worked in a flower shop to earn money, before using local knowledge to find the fastest connections. They reached Huangyao on Day 35, a day before the other teams. All the other teams travelled to Xi'an before heading south to Guilin in Guangxi, although Natalie & Shameema went to Jiayuguan first to see the Great Wall of China at Jiayu Pass. After arriving in Guilin, Josh & Felix decided to spend time and money going rock climbing at Yangshuo.

In order to save money, Tony & Elaine travelled on a slow train to Guilin, and took a break there. At the end of this episode, Tony & Elaine had still not arrived at the checkpoint. Their arrival was shown in the following episode, at which point it was confirmed that they were 38.5 hours behind leaders Darron & Alex, who had already departed on the next leg.

Leg 5: Huangyao → Koh Rong

Elaine & Tony were a long way behind the other teams, so they decided to spend money on taxis and express train to reach Vietnam on the same day they left the checkpoint before the border closed for the night. They were the only team to succeed in this effort, and made up much of the time lost during the previous leg.

Darron & Alex, despite a 22-hour advantage on their closest rivals, had to work in Hội An selling sugarcane juice as they were running low on funds, which allowed Elaine & Tony to catch up with them and they crossed the Cambodian border on the same bus. Darron & Alex decided to work for bed and board at an elephant sanctuary in Mondul Kiri while Elaine & Tony worked in a rice field in Kratié, but both teams took the same boat to Koh Rong and came in joint first place.

Both Josh & Felix and Natalie & Shameema opted for the southern route, and ended up on the same train to Ho Chi Minh City. They were delayed on the train by a typhoon for 14 hours, and arrived at Koh Rong on the same boat.

Leg 6: Koh Rong → Singapore

Both Elaine & Tony and Natalie & Shameema spent funds on taxis to Cambodia. Darron & Alex and Josh & Felix had less money, and had to take a longer route to Bangkok via Phnom Penh.  As Darron & Alex had little money left, they worked in Bangkok as dog walkers at a dog training centre. Tony injured his back while on the bus, and the team had to take a break in Krabi. However, they managed to get the last seats on the direct bus to Singapore from Hat Yai.  Although their bus broke down in Malaysia, they were the first team to reach the last checkpoint on the observation deck at Marina Bay Sands in Singapore ahead of Darron & Alex.

Nearly out of cash, Josh & Felix had to work in a hostel in Krabi. They eventually finished last, and did not have enough money to reach the final checkpoint. However, they were given the money by Natalie & Shameema so they could complete the race.

Reception
Race Across the World has received generally positive reviews mixed with some negative reviews.  Michael Hogan of The Telegraph found the first series "fiendishly addictive", and thought that it "reaffirmed one's faith in human nature" where friendships are "formed across cultural divides", with the series ending on an act of kindness that was "apt" and "heartwarming". Jeff Robson of the i newspaper regarded the series "flawed but engaging", and considered that although the show lacked the "challenges of some extreme travelogues, nor the sense of peril", it "succeeded in recreating the combination of unexpected highlights, soul-destroying lows and crucial budget decisions which characterised old-school seat of the pants travel". Carol Midgley of The Times regarded the challenge of racing to be "quite tough" and "dramatic".

Ratings
The first episode had an overnight viewing figure of 1.5 million. The audience grew over the weeks, and in the final episode, it had an overnight viewing figure of 2.4 million.

References

External links
Race Across the World (series 1)

2019 British television seasons
Television shows filmed in England
Television shows filmed in France
Television shows filmed in Germany
Television shows filmed in Hungary
Television shows filmed in Serbia
Television shows filmed in North Macedonia
Television shows filmed in Italy
Television shows filmed in Greece
Television shows filmed in Turkey
Television shows filmed in Georgia (country)
Television shows filmed in Azerbaijan
Television shows filmed in Kazakhstan
Television shows filmed in Uzbekistan
Television shows filmed in China
Television shows filmed in Vietnam
Television shows filmed in Cambodia
Television shows filmed in Thailand
Television shows filmed in Malaysia
Television shows filmed in Singapore